Rickenbach is a municipality in the district of Winterthur in the canton of Zürich in Switzerland.

Geography

Of this area, 61.4% is used for agricultural purposes, while 22.4% is forested. Of the rest of the land, 16% is settled (buildings or roads) and the remainder (0.2%) is non-productive (rivers, glaciers or mountains).   housing and buildings made up 11.3% of the total area, while transportation infrastructure made up the rest (4.6%). Of the total unproductive area, water (streams and lakes) made up 0.2% of the area.   12.2% of the total municipal area was undergoing some type of construction.

Demographics
, 9.0% of the population was made up of foreign nationals.   the gender distribution of the population was 49.2% male and 50.8% female. Over the last 10 years the population has grown at a rate of 27.7%. Most of the population speaks German  (95.8%), with Italian being second most common ( 1.2%) and English being third ( 0.4%).

In the 2007 election the most popular party was the SVP which received 46% of the vote.  The next three most popular parties were the SPS (13.2%), the FDP (12%) and the CSP (11.6%).

The age distribution of the population is children and teenagers (0–19 years old) make up 25.4% of the population, while adults (20–64 years old) make up 59.1% and seniors (over 64 years old) make up 15.5%.  In Rickenbach about 86.2% of the population (between age 25-64) have completed either non-mandatory upper secondary education or additional higher education (either university or a Fachhochschule).  There are 833 households in Rickenbach.

Rickenbach has an unemployment rate of 2.14%.  , there were 99 people employed in the primary economic sector and about 30 businesses involved in this sector.  82 people are employed in the secondary sector and there are 21 businesses in this sector.  258 people are employed in the tertiary sector, with 58 businesses in this sector.   43.4% of the working population were employed full-time, and 56.6% were employed part-time.

 there were 615 Catholics and 1374 Protestants in Rickenbach. In the 2000 census, religion was broken down into several smaller categories. Of the rest of the population, 0% were Muslim, 2.3% belonged to another religion (not listed), 2.7% did not give a religion, and 7.4% were atheist or agnostic.

Transport 
Rickenbach-Attikon railway station is a stop of the Zürich S-Bahn on services S24 and S30.

References

External links 

 Official website 

Municipalities of the canton of Zürich